is a railway station in Aoba-ku, Sendai in Miyagi Prefecture, Japan, operated by East Japan Railway Company (JR East).

Lines

Station layout
The station has one side platform serving a single bi-directional track. The station is unattended. The platforms are located at the top of an embankment, with the station building at a lower level, connected by stairs.

History
Kuzuoka Station opened on 16 March 1991. On 26 October 2003, compatibility with Suica IC cards was added to the station. On 15 December 2006, the administrative station to Kuzuoka Station was changed from Kita-Sendai Station to Ayashi Station.

Passenger statistics
The average number of passengers per day at this station is notably low compared to other stations on the Senzan Line, but it is often used by visitors to the Kuzuoka Cemetery during the Obon and Higan periods.

Surrounding area
 
 Kuzuoka Cemetery
 Hirose River

See also
 List of railway stations in Japan

References

External links

 

Stations of East Japan Railway Company
Railway stations in Sendai
Senzan Line
Railway stations in Japan opened in 1991